Halifax Armdale is a provincial electoral district in  Nova Scotia, Canada, that elects one member of the Nova Scotia House of Assembly. This Halifax district covers the growing population of the Fairmount, Armdale and Cowie Hill areas. The northern boundary is Highway 102, the eastern boundary is Joseph Howe Drive and the Northwest Arm, while the southern boundary is Frog Pond Park in Armdale.

The district was created in 1992 as Halifax Fairview and encompassed the Cowie Hill area, formerly part of Halifax Atlantic; the Fairview area, formerly part of Halifax Bedford Basin; and the area west of the CNR tracks, formerly part of Halifax Chebucto. In 2013, following the recommendations of the 2012 Electoral Boundaries Commission, it was renamed Halifax Armdale and gained 18 per cent of the district of Halifax Atlantic, including the area east of Herring Cove Road and north of the Frog Pond Park. It lost the area north of Highway 102 and east of Northwest Arm Drive and Dunbrack Street to Fairview-Clayton Park.

Geography

Members of the Legislative Assembly
This riding has elected the following Members of the Legislative Assembly:

Election results

1993 general election

1996 by-election

|-

|New Democratic Party
|Eileen O'Connell
|style="text-align:right"|4,434
|style="text-align:right"|65.24
|style="text-align:right"|19.72
|-

|Progressive Conservative
|Rosanna Liberatore
|style="text-align:right"|1,250
|style="text-align:right"|18.39
|style="text-align:right"|–1.36
|-

|}

1998 general election

1999 general election

2001 by-election

|-

|New Democratic Party
|Graham Steele
|style="text-align:right"|2,164
|style="text-align:right"|58.17
|style="text-align:right"|11.94
|-

|-

|Progressive Conservative
|Narayana Swamy
|style="text-align:right"|466
|style="text-align:right"|12.53
|style="text-align:right"|–14.55
|-

|}

2003 general election

2006 general election

2009 general election

2013 general election

|-

|Liberal
|Lena Diab
|style="text-align:right"| 3,208
|style="text-align:right"| 49.34
|style="text-align:right"| 28.32
|-

|New Democratic Party
|Drew Moore
|style="text-align:right"| 2,233
|style="text-align:right"| 34.34
|style="text-align:right"| –29.37
|-

|Progressive Conservative
|Irvine Carvery
|style="text-align:right"| 1,061
|style="text-align:right"| 16.32
|style="text-align:right"| 4.17
|}

2017 general election

2021 general election

References

External links
 2013 riding profile

Nova Scotia provincial electoral districts
Politics of Halifax, Nova Scotia
2012 establishments in Nova Scotia